The FIS Ski Flying World Championships 2012 was a World championship in ski flying, held in Vikersund, Norway, from 23 to 26 February 2012. Vikersund hosted the event previously in 1977, 1990, and 2000.

Events leading up to the championships
In 2010, the hill was being rebuilt. This process which was started after the 2008-09 Ski Jumping World Cup, extended the length of the hill to HS225, making it the world's largest ski jumping hill. Cost to renovate the hill was planned at 80 million kr (€10 million). Included in the cost was a new judges tower, a ski lift, a spectator area, and wind nets.

Hill construction took place where the old hill that was demolished in 2009. Adjustments was the hill turned several degrees and built  into the ground to avoid wind problems. Outrun was elevated  in order for it to be the same levels as the rest of the jumping hills at Vikersund.

The first ski flying competition in the hill took place in 1966 and the hill has been rebuilt on several occasions, most recently for the FIS Ski Flying World Championships in 2000 where it was at a K185 position. It should be ready in time for the World Cup competition in February 2011.

Schedule

Results

Qualifying
23 February 2012

Individual

Day 1 of individual competition, at Feb 24 event was cancelled due to strong wind. At first trial round was cancelled, then after 35 jumpers 1st round was cancelled and second round also. Day 2, at Feb 25 trial round was also cancelled, but manage to finish the 3rd and final round. That was the official result with two series in competition only instead of four series. 
24–25 February 2012

Team

26 February 2012

Medal table

References

External links

Official website 

FIS Ski Flying World Championships
FIS Ski Flying World Championships
FIS Ski Flying World Championships 2012
FIS Ski Flying World Championships
FIS Ski Flying World Championships 2012
Modum
February 2012 sports events in Europe